Kyle XY is an American science fiction television series produced by ABC Family. The central character is a teenage boy (Matt Dallas) who awakens naked in a forest outside Seattle, Washington, with no more knowledge or abilities than a newborn and no belly button. He is taken in by a family and given the name Kyle. The series follows Kyle as he tries to solve the puzzles of who he is and why he has no memory before that day. Although set in present-day Seattle, the series was filmed in the Vancouver, British Columbia area.

The show premiered June 26, 2006, on the ABC Family cable channel. Episodes were also broadcast on the ABC network the first season, but only for part of the second season, after which it was only seen on ABC Family.

After the 10-episode debut season on ABC Family during summer 2006, news reported a total of 23 new episodes were ordered for the second season, which started on June 11, 2007, with rebroadcasts on ABC beginning on June 15, 2007. The second season's 13th episode, "Leap of Faith", aired on Monday, September 3, 2007; the remaining 10 began airing on January 12, 2008.

The German version was aired December 8, 2007. The show started its second season in the UK on Monday, September 3, 2007, and on April 5, the first season was broadcast in France on M6. On October 5, 2007, TV Guide reported that ABC family had renewed Kyle XY for a third season of 10 episodes, which began airing on January 12, 2009.

On January 31, 2009, ABC Family announced that Kyle XY would not be returning for a fourth season. The season finale of the show aired on Monday, March 16, 2009, at 9/8c on ABC Family, leaving several unresolved dramatic cliffhangers. Following the last episode, writer Julie Plec revealed what had been planned for further seasons. She also noted that the season three DVD would contain a "mini wrap-up" feature for the series. The "wrap-up" is called "Kyle XY: Future Revealed", with the writers and actors explaining their plans for future episodes and what would have ultimately happened in the series ending.

Cast and characters

Main
 Matt Dallas as Kyle Trager, a teenager in desperate search of his missing belly button and the meaning of life. 
 Marguerite MacIntyre as Nicole Trager
 Bruce Thomas as Stephen Trager
 April Matson as Lori Trager
 Jean-Luc Bilodeau as Josh Trager
 Chris Olivero as Declan McDonough
 Kirsten Prout as Amanda Bloom
 Jaimie Alexander as Jessi Hollander (seasons 2–3)

Recurring
 Chelan Simmons as Hillary
 Nicholas Lea as Tom Foss
 Teryl Rothery as Carol Bloom
 Cory Monteith as Charlie Tanner (seasons 1–2)
 J. Eddie Peck as Adam Baylin (seasons 1–2)
 Sarah-Jane Redmond as Rebecca Thatcher (season 1–2)
 Andrew Jackson as Cyrus Reynolds (seasons 1–2)
 Bill Dow as Professor William Kern (seasons 1–2)
 Kurt Max Runte as Detective Jason Breen (season 1)
 Magda Apanowicz as Andy Jensen (seasons 2–3)
 Martin Cummins as Brian Taylor (season 2)
 Ally Sheedy as Sarah Emerson (seasons 2–3)
 Leah Cairns as Emily Hollander (season 2)
 Conrad Coates as Julian Ballantine (season 2)
 Josh Zuckerman as Mark (seasons 2–3)
 Jesse Hutch as Nate Harrison (season 3)
 Hal Ozsan as Michael Cassidy (season 3)

Episodes

Home media

Reception

Ratings
Kyle XY was ABC Family channel's highest-rated original series from June 2006 to July 2008. The show lost its reign when the series premiere of The Secret Life of the American Teenager brought in 2.8 million viewers. According to the same press release, Kyle XY received a household rating of 2.1 and reached 2.6 million viewers. The repeat showing of the first episode on sister broadcast network ABC had more than 5.2 million viewers. Several news sources said low ratings is one of the reasons for the series' cancellation.

The third-season premiere (in a new time slot, with high-viewership lead-in The Secret Life of the American Teenager) was 1.5 million total viewers, down 33 percent from the Season 2 opener, and most ABC Family shows significantly outperformed the show. The second episode slid to 1.426 million viewers.

Accolades

In other media

Novels
There are currently two novels based on the series, both from author S. G. Wilkins. The first, Kyle XY: Nowhere to Hide, concerns Kyle's first Halloween, while the second, Kyle XY: Under the Radar, concerns the school's presidential election, with Kyle as a candidate.

Soundtrack and music

On May 22, 2007 a soundtrack for Kyle XY was released. It was released on the same day as the release of the first season. Track listing is as follows:

 "Hide Another Mistake" – The 88
 "Nevermind the Phonecalls" – Earlimart
 "Surround" – In-Flight Safety
 "I'll Write the Song, You Sing For Me" – Irving
 "Wonderful Day" – O.A.R.
 "Bug Bear" – Climber
 "Honestly" – Cary Brothers
 "So Many Ways" – Mates of State
 "Middle Of the Night" – Sherwood
 "Alibis" – Marianas Trench
 "It’s Only Life" – Kate Voegele
 "3 A.M." – Sean Hayes
 "Born On the Cusp" – American Analog Set
 "Will You Remember Me (Lori's Song)" – April Matson
 "Alley Cat (Demo)" – Sherwood (iTunes Bonus Track)

The music supervisor for the show is Chris Mollere. Michael Suby wrote the opening theme, and most of the score and cues. Neither the theme nor any of the score appear on the soundtrack CD.

Music from Kyle XY

Alternate reality game
Kyle XY featured an online alternate reality game during the first season in which players were "invited" to help solve the mystery of Kyle's actual identity. ABC Family and Touchstone hosted a website by the fictional business The Mada Corporation that served as the game's rabbit hole introducing players to the in-game universe, but the project ended during the second season.

See also
 D.A.R.Y.L.
 John Doe
 John From Cincinnati
 Benjaman Kyle
 XY sex-determination system

References

External links

 
 
 Kyle XY on TV.com
 Kyle XY on TV Squad
 Comprehensive list of Kyle XY music

2000s American science fiction television series
2000s American teen drama television series
2006 American television series debuts
2009 American television series endings
2007 soundtrack albums
ABC Family original programming
American Broadcasting Company original programming
English-language television shows
Serial drama television series
Television series about cloning
Television series about families
Television series about teenagers
Television series by ABC Studios
Television shows set in Seattle
Television shows filmed in Vancouver